Tamarack Peak is a 9,897-foot-elevation mountain summit located in Washoe County, Nevada, United States.

Description
Tamarack Peak is set six miles north of Lake Tahoe on the boundary that Lake Tahoe Basin Management Unit shares with Humboldt-Toiyabe National Forest. It is part of the Carson Range, which is a subset of the Sierra Nevada. Precipitation runoff from this mountain drains north into headwaters of Galena Creek, and south to Ophir Creek. The Tahoe Rim Trail traverses the slopes of the peak, providing an approach option.

Etymology
This landform's toponym was officially adopted in 1988 by the U.S. Board on Geographic Names. The peak is named for the Tamarack tree, a member of the larch family which does not grow in this region, but may have been confused with the Tamarack pine (Pinus contorta murrayana), also called Sierra lodgepole pine, which is a common tree around Lake Tahoe.

Climate
According to the Köppen climate classification system, Tamarack Peak is located in an alpine climate zone. Most weather fronts originate in the Pacific Ocean, and travel east toward the Sierra Nevada mountains. As fronts approach, they are forced upward by the peaks (orographic lift), causing them to drop their moisture in the form of rain or snowfall onto the range. Most of the snow in Nevada falls from December through March.

See also
 List of Lake Tahoe peaks

Gallery

References

External links
 Weather forecast: Tamarack Peak

Mountains of Washoe County, Nevada
Mountains of Nevada
Humboldt–Toiyabe National Forest
North American 3000 m summits
Mountains of the Sierra Nevada (United States)